The 2008–09 English Hockey League season took place from September 2008 until March 2009. The league was sponsored by Slazenger and the men's title was won by East Grinstead with the women's title going to Bowdon Hightown. There were no playoffs during the season.

The Men's Cup was won by Reading and the Women's Cup was won by Bowdon Hightown.

Men's Slazenger Premier Division League Standings 

deducted one point*

Results

Women's Slazenger Premier Division League Standings

Men's Cup

Quarter-finals

Semi-finals

Final 
(Held at the Highfields Hockey Centre, Nottingham on 17 May)

Women's Cup

Quarter-finals

Semi-finals

Final 
(Held at Highfields Hockey Centre, Nottingham on 17 May)

References 

England Hockey League seasons
field hockey
field hockey
England